The Frigate Ecojet (in Russian: Фрегат Экоджет, transliterated as Fregat Ekodzhet), is a program for the development of a new wide-body medium-haul civil aircraft using new aerodynamic, and design configurations. The project started in 1991 as the twinjet Tu-304 under the leadership of Valentin Klimov (then chief designer of the Tupolev design bureau), being initially projected to carry up to 500 passengers. Since 2004 the project has been carried out by a new design bureau, led by Valentin Klimov and instituted as a daughter company of Tupolev, headed by Valentin Klimov's son, Alexandr Klimov. Since 2017, the quadjet aircraft design has been branded the Frigate Freejet.

Initial technical characteristics

The primary goal of the Frigate Ecojet program was the development of a range of new wide-body medium-haul aircraft, intended to be operational by 2018.

The new wide-body aircraft uses an oval fuselage configuration. The chosen form ensures minimal dimensions for the aircraft with 300–350 passengers in three cabins, three main aisles, no less than 500 mm (20 inches) wide and spaces between seats no less than 810 mm (32 inches). In an all-economy layout, the number of seats can be increased to 400. The aircraft can accommodate 302 passengers in a basic three-class layout (Business Class, Premium Economy and Economy).
    
In 2015 the company and project engineers were relocated from Moscow to an undisclosed non-EU European country in order to seek flight certification from EASA rather than Russia, since this offered savings due to the host country determining certification authority. Russian standards are lower and not yet harmonized with EASA/FAA and if it was based in Russia it would have to repeat at least 30% of qualifying flights for EASA to receive a European flight certification as well as meeting more stringent design standards. If the company were based in an EASA country it could receive EASA and FAA dual certification from a single test program. Sergey Grachev, director of marketing sales for the Frigate Ecojet stated 'It is impossible to develop and create this kind of aircraft here'. The company still intends to perform its first flight in 2018 or 2019 and enter into service in 2021.
When moving to Europe the company will also seek to harmonize cockpit design with a competitor to reduce pilot training costs.

In January 2016 the company announced that it had completed wind tunnel trials in Germany in partnership with ThyssenKrupp and that the first 15 (unofficially first 45) aircraft would be manufactured and certified in the EU in a location to be announced on Feb 2016, believed to be in the short list were Germany, Czech Republic and Slovakia. The performance specifications were also frozen at 352–400 passengers in all-economy seating, MTOW 123t, a range of 2340 km with a payload of 33.4t and 4500 km with 24.7t, a minimum runway length of 2375m and a speed of Mach 0.8. No announcement on a production location followed however.

From Ecojet to Freejet

The company said it was dissatisfied with the age of the current engines on the market in the desired power class with no new or updated models in development and lacking the funds and time (around 3–5 years of development) to sponsor development of its own.

Gallery

See also
 Aurora D8
 Middle of the market
 Narrowbody aircraft
 Airbus A320neo
 Boeing 737 MAX
 Comac C919
 Irkut MC-21
 Widebody aircraft
 Airbus A330
 Boeing 787

References

Proposed aircraft of Russia
Quadjets
Wide-body aircraft